Tang Di ((c. 1287 –  1355), style name as Zihua (子華), pseudonym as Dunzhai, was a Chinese landscape painter during the Yuan Dynasty (1279–1368).

Tang Di was born in the Zhejiang province. Tang Di's poetry and painting were celebrated by the local aristocracy while he was still a young artist. He initially studied the landscape style of Chao Meng-fu. He later also turned to the styles of Wei Yen, Li Ch'eng, and Kuo Hsi. In 1338, Tang Di painted Fishermen Returning on a Frosty Bank.

References

External links
Sung and Yuan paintings, an exhibition catalog from The Metropolitan Museum of Art Libraries (fully available online as PDF), which contains material on Tang Di (see list of paintings)

1287 births
1355 deaths
Painters from Zhejiang
Yuan dynasty landscape painters
People from Huzhou